The Shuswap language is the traditional language of the Shuswap people of British Columbia. An endangered language, Shuswap is spoken mainly in the Central and Southern Interior of British Columbia between the Fraser River and the Rocky Mountains. According to the First Peoples' Cultural Council, 200 people speak Shuswap as a mother tongue, and there are 1,190 semi-speakers.

Shuswap is the northernmost of the Interior Salish languages, which are spoken in Canada and the Pacific Northwest of the United States. There are two dialects of Shuswap:
Eastern: Kinbasket (Kenpesq’t) and Shuswap Lake (Qw7ewt/Quaaout)
Western: Canim Lake (Tsq’escen), Chu Chua (Simpcw), Deadman's Creek (Skitsestn/Skeetchestn)–Kamloops (Tk'emlups), Fraser River (Splatsin, Esk’et), and Pavilion (Tsk’weylecw)–Bonaparte (St’uxtews) 
The other Northern Interior Salish languages are Lillooet and Thompson.

Most of the material in this article is from Kuipers (1974).

Language decline 
Many Indigenous languages, like Secwepemctsín, experienced rapid decline with the institution of the residential schools. These schools prohibited the use of Indigenous languages in speech and in writing, resulting in two to three generations of students who were severely punished for not using English. Although some children forced to attend these residential schools can still speak their mother tongue, they have experienced much trauma which has great negative consequences on the future generations.

After residential schools were shut down, Aboriginal children entered the mainstream schooling system which is dominated by English. Inter-generational transmission of Indigenous languages was severely disrupted due to the dominance of English in education and in the workplace. This further contributed to the drastic decline of Indigenous languages. For example, the number of fluent speakers of Secwepemctsín had dwindled to 3.5 per cent by the mid-1990s.

Language revitalization and technology
An interface to Facebook is available in Secwepemctsín. The First Voices website has a Secwepemctsin (Eastern Dialect) Community Portal, a Secwepemc Community Portal, and a Splatsin (Eastern dialect) Community Portal  for language learning. A November 2012 article estimated about 150 fluent speakers, mostly over 65, adding that "an estimated 400 students are learning the language, and "the majority of Secwepemctsin learners are under age 19." Secwépemc language applications are available for iOS. The Secwepemc Cultural Education Society released Nintendo DSi software in 2013 that teaches Secwepemctsin to young children. A language authority of ten elder fluent speakers, from East, West, and the North, are recording pronunciation. , a language tutor was also in preparation, exportable onto CD for use offline. David Lacho, a University of British Columbia master's student, developed an augmented reality storybook app called Tuwitames, available on the Apple App Store, to help people learn the Splatsin dialect of Secwepemctsín in support of the community’s language revitalization initiatives.

A  (language nest) at Adams Lake is conducted entirely in the Secwepemc language. A language nest program in Secwepemctsín also takes place with the Splatsin Tsm7aksaltn (Splatsin Teaching Centre) Society where the grandmothers interact with and teach the children. On January 21, 2013, Thompson Rivers University began offering a Secwepemctsín language class taught by fluent speaker Janice Billy.

Phonology

The Shuswap language has many consonants which the Roman alphabet is typically not used to represent.  Two systems of representing Shuswap sounds are in use.  One is the system used in Kuipers’ 298-page monograph on the language.  It uses some letters which are not part of the Roman alphabet.  The other system is based on one devised by Randy Bouchard of the British Columbia Language Project.  It is based entirely on the Roman alphabet.  The one exception is the symbol 7, which is used to represent a glottal stop.

The Bouchard style system appears to be the one in use among Shuswap people themselves.  Aside from the different symbols used, other differences exist between the two systems.  The Kuipers’ system makes extensive use of automatic alternations.  For example, the letter n is sometimes pronounced , sometimes , and sometimes .  The choice of pronunciation is based on automatically applied rules.  The reader is expected to know these rules.

The rules cover three classes of changes: (1) automatic darkening of vowels (Non-automatic darkening of vowels is covered under Phonological Processes.), (2) automatic alternation of sonorants between consonantal and vocalic pronunciation, and (3) alternation of plain velars, uvulars, and laryngeals with the corresponding rounded sounds.  The Bouchard style system does not appear to require the reader to know so many alternation rules.  Examples of words written in the Bouchard style can be seen on two websites.  These websites do not contain enough examples to show how all the automatic alternations are handled in the Bouchard style system.  Therefore the Kuipers’ system of spelling is used in this article.

Vowels
The Shuswap language has five full vowels, and one reduced vowel, .

Its description is ambiguous.

There are restrictions on the distribution of vowels. The vowel  is restricted to unstressed syllables. The vowels  and  also occur in unstressed syllables, but only in a few words.

Automatic vowel darkening

The previous table shows the normal pronunciation of the vowels. Automatic darkening is predictable; it occurs before uvular obstruents and before or after uvularized sonorants. It is not reflected in the Kuipers spelling system.
Example: e  in ‘he shoots it’ qemns , but e  in ‘I shoot it’ qeqmn

Consonants
Consonants are divided into two classes, obstruents and sonorants.  In the tables which follow, pronunciations are given in square brackets in IPA transcription.  The notation is the same as that of Kuipers (1974).

 Plain plosives are usually unaspirated, and can be voiced in some environments.
 Glottalized dental-lateral plosive t’  can also be pronounced as a glottalized dental plosive 
 The sonorants are voiced. Since they can be consonantal or vocalic, a pair of pronunciations is given for each in the table.  Vocalic variants occur only in unstressed syllables
 Consonantal forms of glottalized sonorants occur only after vowels.
 The long vowels representing plain vocalic sonorants are variable in length and may be short.
 There is no glottalized plain uvular sonorant .  Where this ought to occur due to phonological processes, what occurs instead is  when a consonantal form is required, and (unstressed)  when a vocalic form is required.

Consonantal-vocalic variation of sonorants 
The variation of sonorants between consonantal and vocalic pronunciations is automatic, and is not indicated in the Kuipers’ spelling system.  The rule for determining this as follows:
To start, all sonorants in a word are to be considered vocalic.
Then, beginning from the right hand side of the word, a sonorant in any one of the following situations is changed to consonantal:
a vowel on its right side;
a vocalic sonorant on its right side; or
a vowel on its left side.

Example 1: l , m  and m  in variants of ‘go ahead!’ x̌ílme  and x̌ílmxe 
Example 2: w  in ‘downstream’ wtemtk 
Example 3: l  and ɣ  in ‘waterfall’ k’°əλlɣʔép 
Example 4: l , w , y  and n  in ‘I catch something in a trap’ lélwyn-kn

Writing system
Kuipers (1974) uses the alphabet shown in the Phonology section. The Shuswap Language Department uses a different alphabet:

Syllable structure

A Shuswap word consists of a stem, to which can be added various affixes. Very few words contain two roots. Any stressed root can have an unstressed alternative, where the vowel is replaced by [ə].

Most roots have the form CVC or CC (the latter only if unstressed). Other roots are CVCC or CCVC.

Suffixes begin either with a stressed vowel (dropped in forms where the root is stressed) or a consonant. Prefixes generally have the form C- or CC-.

Stress

Stress in Shuswap is not very prominent, and occurs only in longer words.

Phonological processes

Although Kuipers (1974) does not specify, in many cases the glottalized or rounded version of a consonant seems to represent an allophonic variation. For example, consonants which have a rounded form are rounded before and after . However, glottalization can be contrastive (the root q’ey-, "set up a structure," versus q’ey’-, "write") or allophonic (the root q’ey- appears with a glottalized final consonant in s-t-q‘ey’-qn, "shed"). Consonant reduplication can also have an effect on glottalization.

There are a number of ways in which sounds are affected by their environments. Resonants in the vocalic position are preceded by an automatic schwa, for example the word  ("daughter"), pronounced . The darkening of vowels, as described below, is another case.

The distribution of vowels is quite complex. The vowels have the following main variants:
 i = 
 u = 
 o = 
 e = .
The environment around uvulars and velars produces a different set of variants, including occasional slight diphthongs. Additionally, some roots cause darkened vowels to appear in suffixes; one example is the prefix -ekst ("hand, arm"), which is darkened in x°əl’-akst. The darkened vowels are as follows:
 e = 
 u = 
 i = .

Morphology

Affixes
Shuswap's affixation system is robust. A nominalizing prefix s- is used to derive nouns from verbs, and prefixes to indicate a resulting state are added to verbs. A sample of Shuswap's small number of prefixes is below:
 /t’l’-/: during a period in the past
 /c-/ or /s-/: hither
 /t-/ or /tk-/: on top of, on the outside
 /wλ-/: group of people
 /ʔ-/: second person singular possessive

Most nouns contain suffixes. Suffixes are also used to indicate transitive, intransitive, and imperative verbs. Below are a few examples taken from the extensive collection of Shuswap suffixes:
 /-eps/: back of neck
 /-tem’/: bottom, canyon, lowland
 /-itʃeʔ/: surface, hide
 /-esq’t/: day
 /-eq/: berries
 /-el’txʷ/: a sheet-like object, skin, bark

Morphological processes
Shuswap makes extensive use of reduplication. Some examples of simple reduplication are:
 Initial reduplication: [s-tíq’m] (bitterroot) to [tətíq’m] (prepare bitterroots)
 Final reduplication: [puxʷ-m] (blow) to [pəxʷ'úxʷ] (swell up)
 Total reduplication: [piq] (white) to [pəq-'piq] (flour)
 Consonant reduplication

In addition, there are several types of complex reduplication, involving patterns such as 11V12, 112V23, and 1123V34 (where 1 represents C1, etc.).

Not all types of reduplication are productive and functional. Total reduplication indicates plurality and consonant reduplication is diminutive, but most other reduplications are difficult to explain.

In addition to reduplication, root morphemes can be modified by interior glottalization, such that a root CVC appears as CʔVC. Although the process is not productive, many recorded forms refer to a state, for example [pʔeɣ] (cooled off) from [peɣns] (he cools it off). Consonant reduplication can proceed as usual with interior glottalization.

Syntax

Word order
Word order in Shuswap is relatively free; syntactical relationships are easily conveyed by the case marking system. However, it is common but not necessary for the predicate to head the sentence.

Sentences with predicate first:
 wist ɣ-citx the house is high
 cut l-nx̌peʔe my grandfather said

Sentences with subject first (rare):
 ɣ-sq°yic m-cunsəs ɣx̌°ʕ°elmx Rabbit was told by fox

Case marking
Shuswap uses two cases: the absolutive, for the subject of an intransitive verb, the subject of a transitive verb, and the object of a transitive verb; and the relative, for all other cases (for example, the actor of a passive verb, or an adverb).

Absolutive Case:
 wist ɣ-citx the house is high
 m-tʔeyns ɣ-x̌°ʕ°elmx ɣ-sk’lep Fox met Coyote

Relative Case:
 wist t-citx° a high house
 m-cuntməs ɣ-sq°yic t-x̌°ʕ°elmx Rabbit was told by Fox (the subject is in the Absolutive)

Other forms
Nouns and verbs appear in for different forms, depending on their syntactic surroundings.

 The plain form: nouns and intransitive verbs, conjugated for person. Additionally, a distinction is made between object-centered and subject-centered words; compare [l-m-wiwktn] "the one I saw" with [l-m-wiwkcms] "the one that saw me."
 The suffixal form: for intransitive verbs, and also transitive verbs and nouns (third person singular only). This form is sometimes optional and sometimes obligatory. Examples of use include as an imperative substitute ([xwislxəx° wl meʔ kicx-k], "run till you get there") and in "if" and "when" sentences ([l-twiwtwn], "when I grew up").
 The nominalized form: for nouns and intransitive verbs. A nominalized intransitive verb refers to the goal object of the action, as in [yʔen t’-sq°iʔq°e l-nstix°C’e l-pəxyewtəs] "this is the groundhog I shot yesterday." Nominalization is also used in questions, either yes-or-no or introduced with "what".
 The ʔs- form: refers to a fact, with overtones of goal-directedness. For example: [cuct-kn ʔnsʔiʔλn] "I want to eat."

Sample lexicon
The following is a list of roots (listed separately or as their simplest derivatives), and a selection of words derived from these roots by affixes.

Words borrowed into English
The word kokanee,  a type of salmon, comes from Shuswap.

References

External links
First Nations Languages of British Columbia entry
Map of British Columbia indigenous language-areas
Ubuntu Secwepemc Localization Team
Shuswap Nation Tribal Council
Secwepemc Cultural Education Society
Bibliography of Materials on the Shuswap Language
Languagegeek.com: Secwepemctsín

+
Interior Salish languages
Indigenous languages of the North American Plateau
First Nations languages in Canada
Languages of the United States
Native American language revitalization